The , also called  or NNR,  is one of Japan's "Big 16" private railroad companies. With headquarters in Fukuoka, it operates local and highway buses, supermarkets, real estate and travel agencies, as well as railways in Fukuoka Prefecture. NNR Operates in Logistics, supplychain solutions, Warehousing and distribution globally with presence over many countries.

In addition, in 1943 the company owned the Nishitetsu Baseball Club, a team in the Japanese Baseball League. From 1950 to 1972, the company owned the Lions (in 1950, known as the Clippers), a Pacific League baseball team.

The company introduced nimoca, a smart card ticketing system, in May 2008.

Routes
Nishi-Nippon Railroad operates four railway lines:

(standard-gauge)
Tenjin Ōmuta Line - linking Nishitetsu Fukuoka (Tenjin) Station in Chūō-ku, Fukuoka and Ōmuta Station in Ōmuta (74.8 km)
Dazaifu Line - linking Nishitetsu Futsukaichi Station in Chikushino, Goto, and Dazaifu Station in Dazaifu (2.4 km)
Amagi Line - linking Miyanojin Station in Kurume and Amagi Station in Amagi, passing through Tachiarai (17.9 km)

(narrow-gauge)
Kaizuka Line - linking Kaizuka Station in Higashi-ku, Fukuoka, and Nishitetsu Shingū Station in Shingū (11.0 km)

Major local bus routes extend to Kitakyushu and serve other municipalities in the prefecture. Long-haul routes carry traffic to other prefectures in Kyushu, across the Kanmon Straits to Shimonoseki, and serve Osaka, Nagoya, and Shinjuku in Tokyo.

Real estate investment
In 2015 Nishitetsu along with Hankyu Hanshin Holdings and a Vietnamese real estate company set up a joint venture to develop condominiums in Vietnam, initially in Ho Chi Minh City.

See also
Rail transport in Japan

References

External links

 
Train & bus schedules (in English)

 
Companies listed on the Tokyo Stock Exchange